Fissurisepta manawatawhia is a species of keyhole limpet, a marine gastropod mollusc in the family Fissurellidae.

References
 Powell A. W. B., New Zealand Mollusca, William Collins Publishers Ltd, Auckland, New Zealand 1979 

Fissurellidae
Gastropods of New Zealand
Gastropods described in 1937